OIR may refer to:

 Organisation Internationale de Radiodiffusion (OIR); after 1960 Organisation Internationale de Radiodiffusion et de Télévision (OIRT).
 Organización Impulsora de Radio, the network division of Grupo Radio Centro.
 Operation Inherent Resolve, a US DoD military operation against ISIL.
 Okushiri Airport—IATA code.
 Oxfordshire Ironstone Railway.